Anthomyza gracilis  is a species of fly in the family Anthomyzidae. It is found in the  Palearctic.

References

External links 
Images representing Anthomyza gracilis at BOLD

Anthomyzidae
Insects described in 1823
Muscomorph flies of Europe